Buzhan may refer to:
 Buzhan, Ilam
 Buzhan, Razavi Khorasan

See also
 Buzhans
 Buzan (disambiguation)